These are the official results of the Men's 5.000 metres event at the 2001 World Championships in Edmonton, Alberta, Canada. There were a total number of 35 participating athletes, with the final held on Friday August 10, 2001.

Medalists

Records

Final

Qualifying heats

Heat 1

Heat 2

See also
 2000 Men's Olympic 5.000 metres

References
 Finals Results
 Semi-finals results
 Heats results

 
5000 metres at the World Athletics Championships